Sewri Flamingo Point Mumbai, is a place near Sewri locality in Maharashtra state of India.

Sewri  Flamingo Point is at a distance of around one kilometre or walking distance of 20 minutes from the Sewri railway station. 

The point has large areas of mudflats which are not only a safe habitat for flamingos in winter but also has adequate food availability. A large number of flamingos reach along with their babies from their breeding area, Rann of Kutch in Gujarat, to Sewri every year. They arrive and stay between the month of October to March. Other bird species come to feed at the flats.

Gallery

See also
Sewri

References

External links
 Directions to Sewri-Mumbai's Flamingo Bay

Geography of Mumbai
Environment of Maharashtra
Birdwatching sites in India
Tourist attractions in Mumbai
Flamingos